Aulacodes cilianalis is a moth in the family Crambidae. It was described by William Schaus in 1924. It is found in Suriname.

The wingspan is about 14 mm. The wings are white, with mostly light cadmium markings.

References

Acentropinae
Moths described in 1924
Moths of South America